The 2017–18 Serbian SuperLiga was the twelfth season of the Serbian SuperLiga since its establishment. The season began on 21 July 2017 and ended on 19 May 2018. FK Partizan are the defending champions from the previous season.

Teams
The league consisted of 16 teams: fourteen teams from the 2016–17 Serbian SuperLiga and two new teams from the 2016–17 Serbian First League. Mačva Šabac, the 2016–17 First League champion, joined SuperLiga for the first time in history. Runners-up Zemun joined the top level ten years after being relegated.

Stadiums and locations

Personnel and kits

Note: Flags indicate national team as has been defined under FIFA eligibility rules. Players and Managers may hold more than one non-FIFA nationality.

Nike supplied the official ball for this season's league.

Regular season

League table

Results

Play-offs

Championship round
The top eight teams advanced from the regular season. Points from the regular season were halved with half points rounded up. Teams played each other once.

League table

Results

Relegation round
The bottom eight teams from the regular season play in the relegation round. Points from the regular season are halved with half points rounded up. Teams play each other once.

League table

Results

Individual statistics

Top goalscorers
As of matches played on 17 May 2018.

Hat-tricks

4 Player scored four goals

Player of the week

Awards

Team of the Season

Player of the season 
 Aleksandar Pešić (Red Star)

Coach of the season
 Vladan Milojević (Red Star)

References

External links
 
 UEFA

Serbia
Serbian SuperLiga seasons
2017–18 in Serbian football leagues